Alessandro Velotto (born 12 February 1995) is an Italian former water polo player. He competed in the men's tournament at the 2016 Summer Olympics, and was part of the team that won the bronze medal.

See also
 List of Olympic medalists in water polo (men)
 List of world champions in men's water polo
 List of World Aquatics Championships medalists in water polo

References

External links
 
 

1995 births
Living people
Water polo players from Naples
Italian male water polo players
Water polo centre backs
Water polo players at the 2016 Summer Olympics
Medalists at the 2016 Summer Olympics
Olympic bronze medalists for Italy in water polo
Water polo players at the 2020 Summer Olympics
21st-century Italian people